Rothmann is an impact crater that is located in the southeastern part of the Moon's near side, about one crater diameter to the southwest of the Rupes Altai scarp. To the southwest is the slightly larger crater Lindenau.

This is a relatively fresh crater that is not significantly eroded. The outer rim is circular and is not overlaid by craters of note. The inner walls have slumped and formed terraces in places. The interior floor is somewhat irregular, and has a central rise near the midpoint.

Satellite craters
By convention these features are identified on lunar maps by placing the letter on the side of the crater midpoint that is closest to Rothmann.

References

 
 
 
 
 
 
 
 
 
 
 
 

Impact craters on the Moon